Buscher is a German surname.  Notable people with the surname include:

Alma Buscher (1899-1944), Bauhaus trained German designer
Arnold Büscher (1899–1949), German SS concentration camp commandant executed for war crimes 
Brian Buscher (born 1981), American baseball player
Gérard Buscher (born 1960), French former footballer and current manager, father of Mickaël Buscher
Mickaël Buscher (born 1987), French footballer, son of Gérard Buscher
Paula Buscher, American college basketball coach

See also
Buescher (or Büscher)

German-language surnames